Gao Lian (fl. 16th century),  was Chinese writer, dramatist and encyclopedist.

Gao Lian was born in Qiantang (钱塘 - present day Hangzhou). His courtesy name was Shenfu (深甫) and his pseudonym was Ruinan Daoren (瑞南道人). He is known to have written the plays Jiexiaoji (节孝记) and Yuzanji (玉簪记, "The Jade Hairpin"). Of the two, he is most noted for latter, a romantic drama about a young impoverished scholar and a Daoist nun.  The piece remains a classic of the Ming period theater in thirty-three scenes, some of which are still performed today. In his discussion of mental illness (hsin-ping), successfully diagnosed the condition now known as bipolar disorder. Gao advised his readers to avoid abortion and show concern for the elderly and physically weak. He suggested we attach ourselves to a major religious system or our inner emptiness will invite some manner of physical disease. Gao suggests he was a resident of Hangzhou and its celebrated West Lake with his area details. His works are a virtual treasure trove for early 17th century aesthetics and material culture such as garden architecture, tea culture and dwarf  trees. The above items were additional examples of his overall aim at the maintenance of bodily health through a quiet enjoyment of human life

Career
Professionally, Gao remained largely outside of official circles and is an example of a Buyi Wenren (布衣文人) or commoner literatus, many examples of whom lived in the 17th century. His writing suggests that he was a resident of Hangzhou and its celebrated West Lake with his area details. Gao’s encyclopedia, Zunsheng Bajian (遵生八笺, "Eight Treatises on the Nurturing of Life"), was first published in 1591 and reprinted at least twice more before 1620.  The eight discourses are as follows:

1. On sublime theories of pure self-cultivation
2. On being in harmony with the four seasons
3. On comport on rising and resting [including one's surroundings, or what we might call interior design, of contemporary rather than ancient manufacture]
4. On extending life and avoiding disease
5. On food and drink
6. On pure enjoyment of cultured idleness [including art collecting, connoisseurship]
7. On numinous and arcane elixirs and medicines
8. On remote wanderings beyond the mundane

References 
 Carpenter, Bruce E., "Kao Lien’s Eight Treatises on the Nurturing of Life." Tezukayama  University Review (Tezukayama daigaku ronshu), Nara, Japan, no. 67, 1990, pp. 38–51. ISSN 0385-7743
 Ci hai bian ji wei yuan hui (辞海编辑委员会）. Ci hai （辞海）. Shanghai: Shanghai ci shu chu ban she （上海辞书出版社）, 1979.
 Clunas, Craig. Superfluous Things:  Material Culture and Social Status in Early Modern China.  Urbana:  University of Illinois Press, 1991 and Honolulu:  University of Hawai'i Press, 2004.
 Hong, Bozhao, "Gao Lian". Encyclopedia of China (Drama and Performed Arts Edition), 1st ed.
 Li, Xiusheng, "Gao Lian". Encyclopedia of China (Chinese Literature Edition), 1st ed.

Notes 

16th-century Chinese people
Writers from Hangzhou
16th-century Chinese dramatists and playwrights